Anarchias galapagensis is a moray eel commonly known as the Minute moray or the Hardtail moray. It was first named by Alvin Seale in 1940 and is found in coral reefs from the Gulf of California to Colombia. At a maximum length of 14 cm, it is regarded as one of the smallest morays worldwide.

References

galapagensis
Fish of the Pacific Ocean
Taxa named by Alvin Seale
Fish described in 1940